Andrey Nikolaevich Egorchev (born 8 February 1978) is a Russian volleyball player who competed in the 2004 Summer Olympics.

He was born in the Tatar Autonomous Soviet Socialist Republic. In 2004, he was part of the Russian team which won the bronze medal in the Olympic tournament. He played six matches.

References

External links
 
 
 

1978 births
Living people
Russian men's volleyball players
Olympic volleyball players of Russia
Volleyball players at the 2004 Summer Olympics
Olympic bronze medalists for Russia
Olympic medalists in volleyball
Medalists at the 2004 Summer Olympics
People from Naberezhnye Chelny
Sportspeople from Tatarstan